Shah Mahmood Safi was the Governor of Laghman in Laghman Province located in eastern Afghanistan.

References

Governors of Laghman Province
Year of birth missing (living people)
Living people